The Cianten is a river which flows in the western part of Bogor Regency, West Java, and is a tributary of the Cisadane River.

Course
The river originates from the Mount Halimun Salak National Park, flowing northwards. It flows for 49.2 km, meeting the Cisadane River still in Bogor Regency. It is Cisadane's longest tributary, with a watershed of 426.5 square kilometers.

History
An inscription, dated from 536 AD from the times of the Tarumanagara Kingdom, had been discovered at Cianten's confluence with Cisadane.

A hydropower plant, the Kracak power station, was erected on Cianten in 1926 and is still operational to this day, producing 18.9 MW of electricity. In 1942, during the Dutch East Indies campaign, the Battle of Leuwiliang occurred between Australian and Japanese forces on the banks of the Cianten river.

Use
Aside from hydropower and irrigation purposes, the Cianten is a popular rafting destination. The rafting route generally ends at the Cisadane confluence.

References

Rivers of West Java
Bogor Regency